Takashi Yamamura (born 19 September 1940) is a Japanese sailor. He competed in the Flying Dutchman event at the 1972 Summer Olympics.

References

External links
 

1940 births
Living people
Japanese male sailors (sport)
Olympic sailors of Japan
Sailors at the 1972 Summer Olympics – Flying Dutchman
Place of birth missing (living people)
Asian Games medalists in sailing
Sailors at the 1970 Asian Games
Medalists at the 1970 Asian Games
Asian Games gold medalists for Japan